Paletwa Township is a township of Matupi District in the Chin State of Myanmar. It consists of Paletwa and Sami towns and Paletwa is the administrative center for the township. Also known as Arakan Hill Tract part of Arakan Division of British Burma.

Geography 
Paletwa Township is located in southernmost part of Chin State.

Borders
Paletwa Township borders on:
Kanpetlet Township and Mindat Township to the east;
Matupi Township to the northeast;
Kyauktaw Township, Minbya Township and Mrauk-U Township of Rakhine State to the south;
Buthidaung Township of Rakhine State, and Bangladesh to the west; and
India to the north.

References

Townships of Chin State